The following are the national records in speed skating in The Netherlands maintained by the Koninklijke Nederlandsche Schaatsenrijders Bond.

Men

Women

References

External links
 Koninklijke Nederlandsche Schaatsenrijders Bond web site

National records in speed skating
Speed skating
Speed skating-related lists
Records
Speed skating